Alpinia arctiflora is a plant in the ginger family (Zingiberaceae) endemic to Queensland.

Description
Alpinia arctiflora is a rhizomatous herb, meaning that the stem takes the form of an underground rhizome with only the leafy shoots and flowers appearing above ground.

The calyx persists at the tip of the capsule, and it holds numerous black or brown seeds about  diameter. It is green at first, turning grey/brown at maturity.

Phenology
Flowering occurs from August to April and the fruits ripen from February to August.

Taxonomy
The snow ginger was first described in 1873 by the Victorian Government botanist Ferdinand von Mueller, published in his massive work Fragmenta phytographiae Australiae as Hellenia arctiflora. In the same year George Bentham renamed the species Alpinia arctiflora, publishing it in his own work Flora Australiensis.

Etymology
The genus name Alpinia was given in honour of the Italian botanist Prospero Alpini. The species epithet arctiflora is built from the Latin words arcticus, "arctic", and flora, "flower", and refers to the white flowers.

Distribution and habitat
This species is endemic to northeastern Queensland, from near Cooktown to Paluma.

Conservation
This species is listed by the Queensland Department of Environment and Science as least concern. , it has not been assessed by the IUCN.

Gallery

References

External links
 
 
 View a map of historical sightings of this species at the Australasian Virtual Herbarium
 View observations of this species on iNaturalist
 View images of this species on Flickriver

arctiflora
Endemic flora of Queensland
Taxa named by George Bentham
Plants described in 1873